Carlos Albán Holguín (21 October 1930 – 11 March 1995) was a Colombian lawyer and politician who served as the 19th Permanent Representative of Colombia to the United Nations. He also served as Minister of National Education during the administration of Julio César Turbay Ayala, and was appointed Mayor of Bogotá by President Misael Pastrana Borrero.

References

1995 deaths
20th-century Colombian lawyers
Colombian Ministers of National Education
Mayors of Bogotá
Permanent Representatives of Colombia to the United Nations
1930 births